Brian Deeny (born 3 February 2000) is an Irish rugby union player, currently playing for United Rugby Championship and European Rugby Champions Cup side Leinster. His preferred position is lock.

Youth
Prior to his rugby career Deeny played gaelic football for St Peter's College, winning a Leinster Schools Senior Football A title. He went on to study biomedical sciences at Trinity College Dublin. Deeny played the majority of his junior rugby for Wexford Wanderers and later Clontarf.

Leinster
Deeny was named in the Leinster Rugby academy for the 2021–22 season. He signed his first senior contract, and was promoted to the full Leinster squad for the 2022–23 United Rugby Championship in March 2022.

Ireland
Deeny appeared for the Irish under-20s at the 2019 World Rugby Under 20 Championship.

References

External links
itsrugby.co.uk Profile

2000 births
Living people
People from Wexford, County Wexford
Irish rugby union players
Leinster Rugby players
Rugby union locks
Rugby union players from County Wexford